Annabergite is an arsenate mineral consisting of a hydrous nickel
arsenate, Ni3(AsO4)2·8H2O, crystallizing in the monoclinic system and isomorphous with vivianite and erythrite. Crystals are minute and capillary and rarely met with, the mineral occurring usually as soft earthy masses and encrustations. A fine apple-green color is its characteristic feature. It was long known (since 1758) under the name nickel bloom; the name annabergite was proposed by H. J. Brooke and W H. Miller in 1852, from Annaberg in Saxony, one of the localities of the mineral. It occurs with ores of nickel, of which it is a product of alteration. A variety, from Creetown in Kirkcudbrightshire, in which a portion of the nickel is replaced by calcium, has been called dudgeonite, after P. Dudgeon, who found it.

Closely related is cabrerite wherein some of the nickel is replaced by magnesium. It is named for Sierra Cabrera in Spain where it was originally found.

References 

Arsenate minerals
Nickel minerals
Monoclinic minerals
Minerals in space group 12
Vivianite group